William Thomas Courtleigh Jr. (March 8, 1892 – March 13, 1918) was an American silent film actor whose career was cut short after he fell victim to the 1918 flu pandemic.

Early years
William Thomas Courtleigh Jr. was born in Buffalo, New York was the son of William Courtleigh, a Canadian-born American stage and screen actor. Two of his four half-brothers (Stephen and Robert) also became actors. They had careers on stage and later in television. His half-brothers were the product of his father's second marriage and considerably younger than him.

Career 
Like his father, Courtleigh began in stock. His film career began the year before playing Rev. Mark Stebbing in the Vitagraph film The Better Man, based on the novel by Cyrus Townsend Brady. Courtleigh appeared in at least 14 films over his brief career and was probably best remembered for playing Neal Hardin in the 1915 serial Neal of the Navy with Lillian Lorraine. Courtleigh played opposite Ann Pennington in her first two films, Susie Snowflake and The Rainbow Princess, both released in 1916. His last film, Children of Destiny, another Brady story, was released in 1920 by Weber Productions.

Personal life
In July 1915, Courtleigh married actress Ethel Fleming, whom he met when they were working for different companies at a studio in Long Beach, California.

Death
Courtleigh died in Philadelphia on March 13, 1918, an early casualty of the worldwide flu pandemic at age 26.

Partial filmography
 Neal of the Navy (1915)
 Susie Snowflake (1916)
 The Rainbow Princess (1916)
 The Heart of a Lion (1917)
 By Right of Purchase (1918)

Sources

External links
 
 

1892 births
1918 deaths
Deaths from Spanish flu
American male silent film actors
20th-century American male actors
American people of Canadian descent
Infectious disease deaths in Pennsylvania